Arthur's Seat is a mountain peak in Edinburgh, Scotland.

Arthur's Seat may also refer to:

Places
 Arthurs Seat, Victoria, a locality and hill in Mornington Peninsula, Australia
 Arthur Seat (Canada), a summit in the Clear Range in British Columbia, Canada
 Arthur's Seat, a promontory near Shiel Hill, New Zealand
 Arthur's Seat, Kandy, a lookout point in Kandy, Sri Lanka
 Pen y Fan, a peak in South Wales

Other uses
 Arthur's Seat (song), a song from the 2010 album The Illusionist: Music from the Motion Picture

See also
 Arthur point, a point in the hills of Mahabaleshwar, India